Caloptilia flavimaculella is a moth of the family Gracillariidae. It is known from the United States (Connecticut and Maine).

References

flavimaculella
Moths of North America
Moths described in 1915